Richard Martin Rodas (born November 7, 1959) is a former pitcher in Major League Baseball. He pitched in 10 games for the Los Angeles Dodgers in the 1983 and 1984 seasons.

External links

Pura Pelota

1959 births
Living people
Albuquerque Dukes players
Baseball players from California
Lethbridge Dodgers players
Los Angeles Dodgers players
Major League Baseball pitchers
Sacramento City College alumni
Sacramento City Panthers baseball players
San Antonio Dodgers players
Sportspeople from Roseville, California
Tigres de Aragua players
American expatriate baseball players in Venezuela